The Menomonee Falls School District is located in Menomonee Falls, Wisconsin. The school district includes four elementary schools, one middle school, and one high school. It employs 658 people.

The district covers most of Menomonee Falls, a section of Lannon, and a small section of Milwaukee in Waukesha County.

History

In 2022 activists aligned with the Republican Party proposed changing the system of electing school board members from an at large system to one where each existing board member would receive a number and particular opponents compete with a particular existing board member based on a number; the new system would not be aligned with geographic areas.

Schools
Secondary schools
North Middle School
Menomonee Falls High School

Elementary schools
Valley View Elementary School
Shady Lane Elementary School
Riverside Elementary School
Benjamin Franklin Elementary School

References

External links
School District of Menomonee Falls

Education in Waukesha County, Wisconsin
Milwaukee
School districts in Wisconsin